The NAIA Men's Bowling Championship is an annual tournament hosted by the National Association of Intercollegiate Athletics to determine the national champion of collegiate men's team ten-pin bowling among its members in the United States.

The inaugural championship was originally scheduled to be held in 2020 but was delayed to 2021 due to the COVID-19 pandemic in the United States. The tournament is held concurrently and at the same location as the NAIA Women's Bowling Championship. 

The reigning national champions are Indiana Tech, who won their first title in 2022.

Results

Champions

See also
NAIA Women's Bowling Championship
NCAA Bowling Championship

References

External links
NAIA Men's Bowling

Bowling